Opus One may refer to:

 "Opus No. 1", a tune by Sy Oliver and Sid Garris
"Opus Number One", a composition known for its use as music on hold
Opus 1 (album), by Yugoslav progressive rock band Opus
 Opus One Winery, United States
 An alternative title for the 1971 demo versions of Mike Oldfield's 1973 album, Tubular Bells

See also
Opus number, numbers assigned to musical compositions